is an athletic stadium in Uozu, Toyama Prefecture, Japan.

It is one of the home stadiums of football club Kataller Toyama.

References

External links
Official site

Sports venues in Toyama Prefecture
Football venues in Japan
Uozu, Toyama
Kataller Toyama
Sports venues completed in 1987
1987 establishments in Japan